James Lundie (20 April 1857 – 16 August 1942) was a Scottish footballer who played as a right back.

Career
Born in Edinburgh, Lundie played club football for Lugar Boswell Thistle, Hibernian and Grimsby Town, and made one appearance for Scotland in 1886. He won the Scottish Cup with Hibernian in 1887, having become the club's joint-first Scotland international representative (alongside James McGhee) a year earlier.

Lundie played for Grimsby a total of six seasons, making 106 league appearances. He was club captain in 1890–91 and between 1892–93 and 1893–94 seasons.

Later life
After retiring from playing he settled in Grimsby, dying there in 1942.

References

1857 births
1942 deaths
Scottish footballers
Scotland international footballers
Lugar Boswell Thistle F.C. players
Hibernian F.C. players
Grimsby Town F.C. players
Association football fullbacks
Date of death missing
Footballers from Edinburgh